Pengana robertbolesi, also referred to as the flexiraptor, is an extinct bird of prey that lived during the Early Miocene (23–16 million years ago).  Living relatives of P. robertbolesi may include the harriers. When alive, it may have resembled a cross between the secretary bird and crested caracara.

Its remains were found in Riversleigh, Queensland, Australia. P. robertbolesi is only known from a tibiotarsus (ankle bone). However, this is of most peculiar construction, allowing the leg to be swivelled backwards and sideways. The bird was thus well adapted to reaching into holes and crevices and extracting prey. The vernacular name flexiraptor was coined to reflect this ability.

References 
 Boles, W. E. (1993a): Pengana robertbolesi, a peculiar bird of prey from the Tertiary of Riversleigh, northwestern Queensland, Australia. Alcheringa 17: 19–26.
 Boles, W. E. (1993b): The fabulous flexiraptor: a bird with a strange twist. Riversleigh Notes 22: 2–3.

External links 
 Australian Museum

Birds of prey
Accipitridae
Fossil taxa described in 1993
Miocene birds of Australia
Riversleigh fauna